B23 may refer to:
 A human nucleolar protein also known as NPM1
 The 2.3L, pre-revision variant of the Volvo Redblock engine
 Bundesstraße 23, federal highway in Germany
 B-23, national highway in Catalonia
 B-23 Dragon, a 1930s bomber aircraft
 B-23 (Michigan county highway)